Lake Osceola is a lake in Winter Park, Orange County, Florida, United States. It is part of the Orlando–Kissimmee–Sanford, Florida Metropolitan Statistical Area.

Lake Osceola was named after the Seminole leader Osceola.

References

Osceola
Winter Park, Florida
Osceola